Capital Pride as the name of an LGBT (lesbian, gay, bisexual, transgender) pride event may refer to:
 Capital Pride (Ottawa), Canada
 Capital Pride (Washington, D.C.)

Pride events with similar names:
 Capital City Pride in Olympia, Washington
 Capitol Pride in Salem, Oregon